Sandon Stolle (born 13 July 1970) is a former professional male tennis player and at one time ranked No. 2 in World doubles.

Sandon is the son of Australian tennis champion Fred Stolle, the former was born in Sydney and now lives in Aventura, Florida, United States.

In his career Stolle has won twenty-two ATP doubles titles, including one Grand Slam title (1998 U.S Open) and reached four Grand Slam finals.

Grand Slam finals

Doubles (1 title, 3 runner-ups)

Career finals

Doubles (22 titles, 29 runner-ups)

Doubles performance timeline

References

External links
 
 
 
 

1970 births
Living people
Australian expatriate sportspeople in the United States
Australian male tennis players
Australian people of German descent
Sportspeople from Miami-Dade County, Florida
Tennis players from Sydney
US Open (tennis) champions
Grand Slam (tennis) champions in men's doubles
People from Aventura, Florida